Averill Park is an urban park located in San Pedro, Los Angeles, California. It features barbecue pits, a gazebo, and an artificial pond.

References

Parks in California
Parks in Los Angeles County, California
Parks in Los Angeles